The 1914 United States Senate election in Arizona was held on Tuesday November 3, Incumbent United States Senator Marcus Aurelius Smith was reelected to a second term defeating state senator Don Lorenzo Hubbell, the Republican nominee, in the general election by a wide margin. Several third party candidates also ran in the election including former Prohibition Party presidential candidate Eugene W. Chafin, Socialist nominee Bert Davis Socialist, and  Progressive nominee J. Bernard Nelson.

Democratic primary

Candidates
 Marcus A. Smith, incumbent U.S. Senator since 1912
 Reese M. Ling, attorney

Results

Republican primary

Candidates
 Don Lorenzo Hubbell, State Senator

General election

See also 
 1914 United States Senate elections

References

1914
Arizona
United States Senate